The majority requirement was met in all 17 districts in the 1804 elections.

See also 
 Massachusetts's 12th congressional district special election, 1804
 United States House of Representatives elections, 1804 and 1805
 List of United States representatives from Massachusetts

Notes 

1804
Massachusetts
United States House of Representatives